Alexander Sergeyevich Stroganov (1733–1811) was a Russian baron and a member of the Stroganov family. He was an assistant to the Minister of the Interior, a longtime President of the Imperial Academy of Arts, director of the Russian Imperial Library and a member of the Russian Academy.

Life 
Stroganov was born on 3 January 1733 in Saint Petersburg, a son of baron Sergey Grigoryevich Stroganow. During 1752–1757 he studied at the universities of Geneva, Bologna (art treasures), and Paris (chemistry, physics, and metallurgy). In Paris he was a Freemason and visited Voltaire.

After the death of his father in 1756, he completed the decoration of the Stroganov Palace in 1760. In 1780 he became a senator. In 1783 he became a member of the Russian Academy, and one of the editors of the Academic Dictionary.

Stroganov was a member of the commission on elaborating the new code of laws during the reign of Catherine the Great (1762–1796). From 1800 until his death he was a president of the Imperial Academy of Arts and director of the Imperial Public Library (1800–1811). He was the second director of the library (after Choiseul-Gouffier). He was also a member of the State Council.

From 1801 as chairman of a board of trustees, he was a supervisor of the Kazan Cathedral, St. Petersburg.

In 1805 he proposed to Alexander I the establishment of a special Manuscript Depository ("депо манускриптов") at the Imperial Library. Manuscripts taken from the collection of Peter P. Dubrovsky formed the basis of this depository.

Stroganov was also a collector of pictures of famous artists.

He died on 27 September 1811 in Saint Petersburg.

References

Further reading 
 Кузнецов С. О. Пусть Франция поучит нас "танцовать". Создание Строгоновского дворца в Петербурге и соеобразие придворной культуры России в первой половине XVIII века. СПб., 2003. — 512 c. — 
 Кузнецов С. О. Не хуже Томона. Государственная, меценатская, собирательская деятельность рода Строгоновых в 1771—1817 гг. и формирование имперского облика С.-Петербурга. СПБ.: Нестор, 2006—447 с — 
 Кузнецов С. О. Дворцы и дома Строгоновых. Три века истории.. — М-СПб: Центрполиграф, МиМ-Дельта, 2008. — 319 с. — 
 Susanne Jaeger, Alexander S. Stroganov (1733-1811): Sammler und Mäzen im Russland der Aufklärung, Böhlau Verlag Köln Weimar, 2007
 Кузнецов С. О. Строгоновы. 500 лет рода. Выше только цари. - М-СПб: Центрполиграф, 2012. - 558 с -

External links 
 
  Строганов Александр Сергеевич 
 Кузнецов С. О. Статья «А. С. Строгонов» для журнала «Адреса Петербурга» 

1733 births
1811 deaths
Philanthropists from the Russian Empire
Counts
Russian librarians
Members of the Russian Academy
Alexander Sergeyevich
Active Privy Councillors, 1st class (Russian Empire)
Burials at Lazarevskoe Cemetery (Saint Petersburg)